Diawadou Barry (born 10 May 1916 in Dabola, French Guinea; died 1 July 1973 in Conakry) was a politician from Guinea who served in the French National Assembly from 1954-1958. He later served as Minister of Economy and Finance and Minister of Education.  The eldest son of Almami Aguibou, he was a descendant of the Soriya branch of the former ruling dynasty in the Islamic confederacy of Fuuta Jalon.

A sometimes voice of opposition, in February 1969 Barry was swept up in the events surrounding the so-called Labé plot (sometimes Kaman-Fodeba plot) against the regime of President Ahmed Sékou Touré.  His arrest and imprisonment was a part of a complex strategy that enabled the government to rid itself of politically troublesome individuals at the time.  Barry was just one of dozens of the accused, who included other ministers and cabinet members, senior civil servants, and military officers—all allegedly participants in the plot.  He was reportedly executed by firing squad in Camp Boiro in July 1973.

References

External links
 http://www.campboiro.org/victimes/barry_diawadou.html Camp Boiro Memorial.
 https://web.archive.org/web/20141026013322/http://www.campboiro.org/bibliotheque/kindo_toure/unique_survivant/tdm.html Kindo Touré.

1916 births
1973 deaths
Finance ministers of Guinea
People from Kankan Region
People of French West Africa
National Centre of Social Republicans politicians
Radical Party (France) politicians
Deputies of the 1st National Assembly of the French Fourth Republic
Deputies of the 2nd National Assembly of the French Fourth Republic
1969 deaths
Government ministers of Guinea
People executed by Guinea by firing squad
People from Dabola